The Yauco Metropolitan Statistical Area is a United States Census Bureau defined metropolitan statistical area (MSA) in southwestern Puerto Rico. A July 1, 2009 Census Bureau estimate placed the population at 125,266, a 6.10% increase over the 2000 census figure of 118,063.

Municipalities
A total of four municipalities are included as part of the Yauco Metropolitan Statistical Area.

Yauco (Principal city) Pop: 34,172
Peñuelas Pop: 20,399
Guayanilla Pop: 17,784
Guánica Pop: 13,787

Combined Statistical Area
The Yauco Metropolitan Statistical Area is a component of the Ponce–Yauco–Coamo Combined Statistical Area.

See also
Puerto Rico census statistical areas

References

 
Metropolitan areas of Puerto Rico